Central University of Punjab is a central research University located in Ghudda village of Bathinda, Punjab, India. It has been established through an Act of Parliament: "The Central Universities Act, 2009" by Govt. of India. The territorial jurisdiction of Central University of Punjab is whole of the State of Punjab. Central University of Punjab has been ranked as number one amongst newly established central universities in India consistently since 2012 as per university rankings of Researchgate and Scopus.

The Central Universities Bill 2009 aims at creating one new central university each in Bihar, Gujarat, Haryana, Himachal Pradesh, Jammu and Kashmir, Jharkhand, Karnataka, Kerala, Orissa, Punjab, Rajasthan and Tamil Nadu. It also seeks to convert Guru Ghasidas Vishwavidyalaya in Chhattisgarh, Harisingh Gour Vishwavidyalaya in Sagar (Madhya Pradesh) and Hemwati Nandan Bahuguna Garhwal University in Uttarakhand into Central universities.

University Profile

The Central University of Punjab, Bathinda (Punjab) has been established through the Central Universities Act 2009 which received the assent of the President of India on 20 March 2009. Its territorial jurisdiction extends to the whole State of Punjab.

It started its functioning from Camp Office in April 2009, which happens to be the residence of the Vice-Chancellor, and from November 2009 it shifted to its City Campus spread over an area of 35 acres. Recently shifted and fully operational in the main campus at Ghudda Village (21.5 km from Bathinda Bus Stand) on Bathinda-Badal Road. It is also 32 km far away from Mandi Dabwali (Haryana). Mandi Dabwali has well connected to New Delhi via NH9.

Academics
The university offers mainly research oriented master's and doctoral degree programmes: Ph.D., M.Sc., M.A., M.Pharm., M.Tech., LL.M., M.Ed. and MBA

Schools and centres
School of Basic Sciences
 Department of Applied Agriculture
 Department of Biochemistry
 Department of Botany
 Department of Chemistry
 Department of Computational Sciences
 Department of Mathematics and Statistics
 Department of Microbiology
 Department of Physics
 Department of Zoology

School of Education
 Department of Education
 Department of Physical Education

School of Engineering & Technology
 Department of Computer Science and Technology

School of Environment and Earth Sciences
 Department of Environmental Science and Technology
 Department of Geography
 Department of Geology

School of Health Sciences
 Department of Human Genetics and Molecular Medicine
 Department of Pharmaceutical Sciences and Natural Products
 Department of Pharmacology

School of Information and Communication Studies
 Department of Library and Information Sciences
 Department of Mass Communication and Media Studies

School of International Studies
 Department of South and Central Asian Studies

School of Languages, Literature and Culture
 Department of English
 Department of Performing & Fine Arts
 Department of Punjabi
 Department of Hindi

School of Legal Studies and Governance
 Department of Law

School of Management
 Department of Financial Administration

School of Social Sciences
 Department of Economic Studies 
 Department of Psychology
 Department of Sociology
 Department of History

Accreditation and ranking

Rankings 

In the young age of fourteen years of establishment, the university has proven itself with NAAC 'A+' Grade.

The Central University of Punjab ranked 84th among universities by National Institutional Ranking Framework (NIRF) in 2021.

Keeping up with the pace the university ranked 81st among universities, and secured 26th position in pharmacy category in National Institutional Ranking Framework (NIRF) ranking 2022.

Research contributions

Researchers from this university had contributed in a number of peer-reviewed scientific research. Among these are discovery of new species of marine alga Ulva paschima and Cladophora goensis, first report of endophytic algae from Indian Ocean, discovery of the geographical origin of Holy Basil as North-Central India, Molecular assessment of Hypnea valentiae-a red alga from West and East coast of India and multitargetted molecular docking analysis of plant-derived natural compounds against PI3K Pathway.

See also
 List of universities in India
 University Grants Commission (India)

References

External links
Official Website

Education in Bathinda
Universities in Punjab, India
Central universities in India
Educational institutions established in 2009
Central University of Punjab
2009 establishments in Punjab, India